Anti Tammeoks (born 29 March 1975) is an Estonian politician. He was a member of X Riigikogu, representing the Union of Pro Patria and Res Publica party.

Early life
Tammeoks was born in Nissi Parish (now, part of Saue Parish).

Career

Personal life

Achievements and honours

References

Living people
1975 births
Isamaa politicians
Members of the Riigikogu, 2003–2007
People from Saue Parish